Euthecta is a genus of butterflies in the family Lycaenidae. The two members (species) of this genus are endemic to the Afrotropical realm.

Species
Euthecta cooksoni Bennett, 1954
Euthecta cordeiroi Henning & Henning, 2004

References

Poritiinae
Lycaenidae genera